Rudy Cerami (born December 26, 1988) is an American football defensive lineman who is currently a free agent. He was signed by the ASI Panthers as an undrafted free agent in 2013. He played college football at East Stroudsburg University. After the ASI Panthers, Cerami was signed by the PIFL's Lehigh Valley Steelhawks, where he played during the 2013 season, before signing with the Philadelphia Soul. Following his release from the Soul. Cerami signed with the Cleveland Gladiators.

References

External links
East Stroudsburg bio
Arena Football League bio

1988 births
Living people
American football defensive ends
East Stroudsburg Warriors football players
Lehigh Valley Steelhawks players
Philadelphia Soul players
Cleveland Gladiators players